Panama competed at the 1992 Summer Paralympics in Barcelona, Spain. 2 competitors from Panama won 3 medals, 1 gold and 2 silver, and so finished joint 38th in the medal table with Bulgaria.

See also 
 Panama at the Paralympics
 Panama at the 1992 Summer Olympics

References 

Panama at the Paralympics
Nations at the 1992 Summer Paralympics